Charles was a schooner launched in 1804, possibly under another name. Between 1811 and 1814 she served as HM hired armed schooner Charles. She then returned to mercantile service. She traded with the Continent and Newfoundland, but for the remainder of her career she sailed between Bristol and Palermo. She was last listed in 1825.

Career
The Royal Navy employed the hired armed schooner on contract between 23 October 1811 and 4 May 1814.

In December 1811, Lieutenant John Little was appointed captain of the hire armed schooner Charles, for service on the Downs station. Charles recaptured two merchant vessels, and witnessed the capture of two French privateers.

One of the recaptured vessels was Nancy, Morrison, master, which Charles recaptured on 8 October 1813.
 
In December 1813, Charles was attached to the fleet under Admiral Young, anchored off Walcheren. In the following spring she carried to France part of the suite of Louis XVIII. On Little's return from this mission, he was appointed to the schooner . 

After the end of her contract with the Navy, Charles returned to mercantile service. She first appeared in Lloyd's Register (LR) in 1814.

Charles was last listed in 1825 with data unchanged since 1820.

Citations and references
Citations

References

 

1804 ships
Hired armed vessels of the Royal Navy
Age of Sail merchant ships of England